This is a list of rivers in Uruguay.  This list is arranged by drainage basin, with respective tributaries indented under each larger stream's name. All rivers in Uruguay drain to the Atlantic Ocean.

 Río de la Plata
 Uruguay River
 San Salvador River
 Río Negro
 Arroyo Grande
 Yí River
 Porongos River
 Chamangá River
 Tacuarembó River
 Caraguatá River
 Queguay Grande River
 Queguay Chico River
 Daymán River
 Arapey Grande River
 Arapey Chico River
 Cuareim River
 San Juan River
 Rosario River
 Santa Lucía River
 San José River
 Santa Lucía Chico
 Bay of Montevideo
 Arroyo Pantanoso
 Arroyo Miguelete
 Arroyo Carrasco
 Arroyo Pando
 Arroyo Solís Chico
 Arroyo Solís Grande
 Lagoa Mirim
 San Luis River
 Arroyo de la India Muerta
 Cebollatí River
 Olimar Grande River
 Olimar Chico River
 Tacuarí River
 Yaguarón River

See also
List of rivers of the Americas by coastline

References

Rand McNally, The New International Atlas, 1993.
 GEOnet Names Server

Uruguay
 
Rivers